Agonochaetia tuvella is a moth of the family Gelechiidae. It is found in Russia (Tuva Republic).

References

Moths described in 2000
Agonochaetia
Moths of Asia